The list of shipwrecks in July 1829 includes some ships sunk, wrecked or otherwise lost during July 1829.

1 July

2 July

4 July

5 July

11 July

14 July

16 July

18 July

19 July

22 July

23 July

28 July

29 July

30 July

Unknown date

References

1829-07